Dave Hudgens (born February 27, 1955) is a former American football defensive tackle who was a member of the Dallas Cowboys in the National Football League . He played college football at the University of Oklahoma.

Early years
Hudgens attended Will Rogers High School before moving on to the University of Oklahoma. As a sophomore, he found initial success as an individual Big Eight Conference champion in the shot put and discus throw.

Playing defensive tackle in football, he became a starter in the last 4 games of his junior season. As a senior, he was considered the strongest player on the team and posted 37 tackles (4 for loss). He was also known for his big plays against the University of Texas and Ohio State University.

Professional career
Hudgens was selected by the Dallas Cowboys in the third round (84th overall) of the 1978 NFL Draft with the intention of converting him into an offensive lineman. As a rookie, he injured his right knee in training camp and was placed on the injured reserve list. He was waived on August 14, 1979.

References

External links
 Oklahoma Sooners profile

1955 births
Living people
Sportspeople from Tulsa, Oklahoma
Players of American football from Oklahoma
American football defensive tackles
Oklahoma Sooners football players
Oklahoma Sooners men's track and field athletes
Dallas Cowboys players
American male discus throwers
American male shot putters